The Gangster is a 2012 Sahamongkol's Thai drama action film  directed and written by Kongkiat Khomsiri.

Synopsis
Bangkok in the 1950s, from Salak Hin lane in Hua Lamphong neighborhood to the seven-storey building in Yaowarat and Wongwian Yi Sip Song Karakadakhom (July 22 Circle), they were under the gang of Thai Chinese mafia called "Four Kings".

Jod and Dang are the young men who goodfriend each other. Especially Dang is a leader and he is very respected among teenagers. They are in a gang by elder members as bosses, but one day Dang also suffered from a fatal car accident. After the coup (1957 coup by Sarit Thanarat) the new government has a policy to get rid of the gangs. As a result, these gang mafia scattered and Jod to fights with who are his former friends and his boss.

Cast
Krissada Sukosol Clapp as Jod/ Jod Howdy
Somchai Kemglad as Dang/ Dang Bireley
Sakarin Suthamsamai as Thong
Krisada Supapprom as Piak
Nantharat Chaowarat as Ploy
Pakchanok Wo-Onsri as Oow Tee
Pornchai Hongrattanaporn as Hia Lor (Elder brother Lor)
Boonsong Nakphoo as Na Hum (Uncle Hum)
Wasu Sangsingkaew as Phu Khan Kham Neung (Commander Kham Neung)
Sonthaya Chitmanee as Serd (cameo)
Pongpat Wachirabunjong as Hia Seng/ Seng Pangtor (Elder brother Seng) (cameo)

Production
The Gangster is a backdrop back in Thailand in the 50s and 60s like Nonzee Nimibutr's Dang Bireley's and Young Gangsters. It was a recalled of Dang Bireley's and Young Gangsters that was released in 1997 and very successful, other characters in Dang Bireley's and Young Gangsters  also have a role in this film such as Dang Bireley or Pu Raberd Khuad (Pu The Bottle Bomb). In the press release launched, Jesdaporn Pholdee who as a Dang Bireley in the 1997 film was also featured in the event.

References

External links
 
 
Official trailer

Thai action films
2012 films
2010s crime films
Thai-language films
Films set in 1956
Films set in 1957
Films set in 1960
Sahamongkol Film International films
Thai crime drama films